The Questionnaire is the second novel of Czech writer and politician Jiří Gruša. When it was originally written in 1974, and a limited number of samizdat copies were distributed. It was formally published in 1978. The English translation followed in 1982. Shortly after its limited release, typed by hand,  Gruša was imprisoned on the charge of 'initiating disorder'. Following widespread protest and media attention, Gruša was released after serving two months in prison. It is Gruša's most well-known and most widely translated novel.

Plot summary
Jan Chrysostom Kepka is asked to complete a questionnaire for a job application, required by the faceless bureaucrat Comrade Pavlenda. What follows is an ironic answer: a full and surreal account of Jan's life and times.

References

20th-century Czech novels
1978 Czech novels
Novels set in the Czech Republic
Czech magic realism novels
Dystopian novels
1974 novels